Yorick Blumenfeld is a writer. He was born in Amsterdam, the son of Erwin Blumenfeld. In 1941, his family moved to New York City, where he attended Columbia Grammar School. He was at Harvard from 1950 to 1954. In 1999, he edited The Naked and the Veiled, a collection of photographs by his father. He is married to the sculptress Helaine Blumenfeld.

Publications 
 Towards The Millennium: Optimistic visions for Change, Chimera Publications.
 The Waters of Forgetfulness, Quartet Books
 Jenny, My Diary, Penguin Books
 See-Saw, Harcourt Brace
 The Naked and The Veiled, Thames and Hudson

References 

Living people
20th-century non-fiction writers
20th-century male writers
Year of birth missing (living people)
Harvard University alumni